|}

The Champion Hurdle Trial is a Grade 2 National Hunt hurdle race in Great Britain held each January, which is open to horses aged four years or older. It is run at Haydock Park over a distance of about 1 mile 7½ furlongs (1 mile 7 furlongs and 144 yards, or 3,149 metres), and with nine hurdles. It is currently sponsored by Unibet. Since 2019, the race has carried the name of The New One, a racehorse who had won the race every year from 2015 to 2018.

The race was first run in 1981, and was awarded Grade 2 status in 2003.

The Champion Hurdle Trial is the third leg in the Unibet-sponsored Road to Cheltenham, and the final race of the series before the Champion Hurdle at the Cheltenham Festival. The other two races in the Road to Cheltenham are the Fighting Fifth Hurdle and the International Hurdle.

Winners
{| class = "sortable" | border="1" style="border-collapse: collapse; font-size:90%"
|- style="background:#77dd77;" align="center"
! width="36px" | Year
! width="160px" | Winner
! width="40px" | Age
! width="180px" | Jockey
! width="180px" | Trainer
|-
|1981||Starfen||9||Tim Easterby||Peter Easterby
|-
|1982||Gaye Chance||7||Sam Morshead||Mercy Rimell
|-
|1983||Ekbalco||7||Jonjo O'Neill||Roger Fisher
|-bgcolor="#eeeeee"
|1984Abandoned because of frost
|-bgcolor="#eeeeee"
|1985Abandoned because of frost
|-
|1986||Humberside Lady||5||Mark Dwyer||Geoff Huffer
|-
|1987||Nohalmdun||6||Lorcan Wyer||Peter Easterby
|-bgcolor="#eeeeee"
|1988Abandoned because of snow
|-
| 1989
| Vicario di Bray
| 6
| Mark Dwyer
| Jonjo O'Neill
|-
| 1990
| Bank View
| 5
| Graham Bradley
| Nigel Tinkler
|- style="background:#eeeeee;"
|1991Abandoned because of frost
|-
| 1992
| Granville Again
| 6
| Peter Scudamore
| Martin Pipe
|-
| 1993
| Jinxy Jack
| 9
| Neale Doughty
| Gordon W. Richards
|-
| 1994
| Flakey Dove
| 8
| Richard Dunwoody
| Richard Price
|-
| 1995
| Relkeel
| 6
| Adrian Maguire
| David Nicholson
|-
| 1996
| Mysilv
| 6
| Jamie Osborne
| Charles Egerton
|-
| 1997
| Mistinguett
| 5
| Carl Llewellyn
| Nigel Twiston-Davies
|-
| 1998
| Dato Star
| 7
| Lorcan Wyer
| Malcolm Jefferson
|-
| 1999
| Master Beveled
| 9
| Glenn Tormey
| David Evans
|-
| 2000
| Dato Star
| 9
| Lorcan Wyer
| Malcolm Jefferson
|- style="background:#eeeeee;"
| 2001Abandoned due to frost
|-
| 2002
| Rodock
| 8
| Tony McCoy
| Martin Pipe
|-
| 2003
| Flame Creek
| 7
| Seamus Durack
| Noel Chance
|-
| 2004
| Rooster Booster
| 10
| Richard Johnson
| Philip Hobbs
|-
| 2005
| Inglis Drever
| 6
| Graham Lee
| Howard Johnson
|-
| 2006
| Al Eile
| 6
| Timmy Murphy
| John Queally
|-
| 2007
| Afsoun
| 5
| Mick Fitzgerald
| Nicky Henderson
|- style="background:#eeeeee;"
|2008Abandoned because of waterlogging
|-
| 2009
| Songe
| 5
| Tom Siddall
| Charlie Longsdon
|-
| 2010
| Medermit
| 6
| Robert Thornton
| Alan King
|- style="background:#eeeeee;"
|2011Abandoned because of frost 
|-
| 2012
| Celestial Halo
| 8
| Daryl Jacob
| Paul Nicholls
|-  style="background:#eeeeee;"
|2013Abandoned because of snow
|-
| 2014
| Melodic Rendezvous
| 8
| Nick Scholfield
| Jeremy Scott
|-
| 2015
| The New One
| 7
| Sam Twiston-Davies
| Nigel Twiston-Davies
|-
| 2016
| The New One
| 8
| Sam Twiston-Davies
| Nigel Twiston-Davies
|-
| 2017
| The New One
| 9
| Sam Twiston-Davies
| Nigel Twiston-Davies
|-
| 2018
| The New One
| 10
| Sam Twiston-Davies
| Nigel Twiston-Davies
|-
| 2019
| Global Citizen
| 7
| David Bass
| Ben Pauling
|-
| 2020
| Ballyandy
| 9
| Sam Twiston-Davies
| Nigel Twiston-Davies
|-
| 2021
| Navajo Pass
| 5
| Sean Quinlan
| Donald McCain Jr
|-
| 2022
| Tommy's Oscar
| 7
| Danny McMenamin
| Ann Hamilton
|}

See also
 Horse racing in Great Britain
 List of British National Hunt races

References
 Racing Post:

 pedigreequery.com – Champion Hurdle Trial – Haydock.

National Hunt races in Great Britain
Haydock Park Racecourse
National Hunt hurdle races
Recurring sporting events established in 1981
1981 establishments in England